The bowling events at the 2001 World Games in Akita was played between 21 and 23 August. 48 competitors, from 23 nations, participated in the tournament. The bowling competition took place at Utenayu Bowl (台由ボウル) in Yokote.

Participating nations

Medal table

Events

References

External links
 Bowling on IWGA website
 Results

 
2001 World Games
2001